John Kenneth Cook (born December 18, 1958 in Van Nuys, California) is an American former international motorcycle speedway rider. He was represented the USA in several World Team Cup Finals.

Career
Cook is mainly remembered for his spell at the Ipswich Witches teams from 1981–1982 and 1984–1986 where he walked out on the club mid-season on both occasions. He also had further spells at Hull Vikings, King's Lynn Stars, Poole Pirates.

Cook was a showman and continued in this vein for the whole of his career, whilst not always riding in the British League, he was a regular rider in the Swedish League with Indianerna where he attained Swedish citizenship in the early 1990s and in fact was the Swedish Champion in 1992 winning all of his rides. He is also attributed with introducing Jet Ski watercraft to Australia, New Zealand and Europe where he became the first European Champion in closed course competition. During a speedway hiatus, he also competed as an American Expert Jet Ski racer and was ranked #4 in the World while racing underpowered craft.

Cook continued to ride well into his 40s and almost qualified for the Speedway Grand Prix Series for 2002, only failing at the 2001 Intercontinental Final stage.

Cook surfaced again on the international Speedway front in 2006 where he was indeed a member of the USA squad for the 2006 Speedway World Cup, however he was not required to ride in the actual competition.

In October 2006 Cook suffered a serious motocross accident while racing at Washougal Washington in which he hurt his back quite badly and had to have metal rods inserted. The rods were later removed as Cook began to make a recovery but he has had to retire from racing and remains retired in his longtime home of Sacramento, California.

National Titles
 1985 American Speedway Champion
 1992 Swedish SM Speedway Champion

World final appearances

Individual World Championship
 1985 -  Bradford, Odsal Stadium - 7th - 9pts
 1987 -  Amsterdam, Olympic Stadium - 8th - 15pts

World Team Cup
 1984 -  Leszno, Alfred Smoczyk Stadium (with Shawn Moran / Kelly Moran / Lance King / Bobby Schwartz) – 3rd – 20pts (2)
 1985 -  Long Beach, Veterans Memorial Stadium (with Shawn Moran / Bobby Schwartz / Lance King / Sam Ermolenko) – 2nd – 35pts (1)
 1987 -  Prague, Marketa Stadium (with Shawn Moran / Rick Miller / Kelly Moran)  - 3rd - 93pts (6)

References

Living people
1958 births
American speedway riders
Ipswich Witches riders
Poole Pirates riders
King's Lynn Stars riders
Hull Vikings riders
People from Van Nuys, Los Angeles